This is a list of albums released by Disney-owned Hollywood Records, including studio albums, soundtrack albums, compilation albums, remix albums, and extended plays released by the label.

1990–1999

2000–2009

2010–2019

2020s

See also 
 Walt Disney Records discography

References 

Hollywood Records